Chthonobacter is a genus of bacteria from the order Hyphomicrobiales with one valid species (Chthonobacter albigriseus).

References

Hyphomicrobiales
Bacteria genera
Monotypic bacteria genera